Sandtown is an unincorporated community in Kent County, Delaware, United States. Sandtown is located on Delaware Route 10, just east of the Maryland border.

The Cow Marsh Old School Baptist Church, Dill Farm Site, and White-Warren Tenant House are listed on the National Register of Historic Places.

References

Unincorporated communities in Kent County, Delaware
Unincorporated communities in Delaware